The MOWAG MR8-01 (Wotan) is an armored personnel carrier.

History

Named as special car (SW1 and SW2) was the WOTAN from 1963 onward introduced by the Bundesgrenzschutz (West German border guard, later Bundespolizei). They were built by Bussing Henschel in Germany, approximately 700 nos. The SW 1 was referred to as Special Car 1. It did not have  any armaments. 

The Special Car 2 was similar to the special SW1, however, it had a turret with armament: 20 mm automatic cannon or a machine gun MG 1/2 of SW 2b. Other options include a mortar vehicle that was built but found no buyers. The Wotan that was built and tested as a prototype by the Federal Border Guard (BGS) is now in the Military Museum Full.

Design 
The vehicle had a small turning radius, and was equipped with 2-axle steering. The arrangement of the engine installed in the rear right allowed the crew to park the vehicle and  exit from the side and rear.

Variants 
 MR 8 "SW1": initially known as Kfz91. Armoured personnel carrier model.
 MR 8 "SW2": initially known as the Kfz91. As described.
MR 8-09: equipped with a 20mm auto-cannon, with four smoke discharges on either side of the turret. Similar to the SW2.
MR 8-20: unguided rocket and ATGM variant, with provision for twin 8 cm missile launchers.
MR 8-23: heavy fire support and tank hunter vehicle with 90mm medium-pressure gun.
MR 9-32: 120mm mortar carrier.

Gallery

References 

Wheeled armoured fighting vehicles
Armoured fighting vehicles of Switzerland
Internal security vehicles
Police vehicles
Military vehicles introduced in the 1960s
Wheeled armoured personnel carriers
Wheeled amphibious armoured fighting vehicles
Armoured personnel carriers of the Cold War